Dasylobus is a genus of harvestmen in the family Phalangiidae.

Species
 Dasylobus amseli (Roewer, 1956)
 Dasylobus arcadius (Roewer, 1956)
 Dasylobus argentatus (Canestrini, 1871)
 Dasylobus beschkovi (Starega, 1976)
 Dasylobus corsicus (Roewer, 1956)
 Dasylobus cyrenaicus (Caporaccio, 1937b)
 Dasylobus egaenoides Simon, 1885
 Dasylobus eremita Simon, 1878
 Dasylobus ferrugineus (Thorell, 1876)
 Dasylobus fuscus (Roewer, 1911)
 Dasylobus gestroi (Thorell, 1876)
 Dasylobus graniferus (Canestrini, 1871)
 Dasylobus insignitus (Roewer, 1912)
 Dasylobus insularis (Roewer, 1956)
 Dasylobus kulczynskii Nosek, 1905
 Dasylobus laevigatus (L.Koch, 1867)
 Dasylobus nivicola Simon, 1879
 Dasylobus rondaensis (Kraus, 1959)
 Dasylobus samniticus Lerma, 1952

References

Harvestmen